Over the Dark Water is a 1992 Russian drama film directed by Dmitry Meskhiev.

Plot 
The film takes place in Leningrad in the 60s. The film tells about a beautiful girl from the province who meets three friends, each of whom invited her to marry him.

Cast 
 Aleksandr Abdulov as Lev
 Kseniya Kachalina as Lena
 Yury Kuznetsov
 Tatyana Lyutaeva	
 Vladimir Ilyin as Vika's Grandpa
 Ivan Okhlobystin
 Viktor Pavlov
 Natan Fyodorovsky
 Viktor Sergeev
 Aleksandr Bashirov

References

External links 
 

1992 films
1990s Russian-language films
Russian drama films
1992 drama films